Bactra coronata is a moth of the family Tortricidae first described by Alexey Diakonoff in 1950. It is found in Sri Lanka, Java, Borneo and the Philippines.

References

Moths of Asia
Moths described in 1950